List of works by or about British science fiction author Peter F. Hamilton.

Novel series

Greg Mandel trilogy (1993–1995) 

Mindstar Rising (1993), 
A Quantum Murder (1994), 
The Nano Flower (1995),

Confederation universe (1996–2000)

 The Reality Dysfunction (1996, published in two volumes in the US: Emergence and Expansion), 
 The Neutronium Alchemist (1997, published in two volumes in the US: Consolidation and Conflict), 
 The Naked God (1999, published in two volumes in paperback in the US: Flight and Faith; the US hardback was one volume), 
 The Confederation Handbook (2000, a guide in non-fiction style to the universe of the Night's Dawn trilogy), 

After the Greg Mandel novels, Hamilton wrote a space opera in three volumes, known collectively as The Night's Dawn Trilogy. The three books are each well over a thousand pages long and are not standalone novels, totalling 1.2 million words. The trilogy is set in a universe with a wealth of worlds and artificial orbiting colonies. The plot is centered on the souls of the dead coming back from a hellish "beyond" to possess the living, and the latter fighting back. It was followed by a companion to the series, The Confederation Handbook, an informational book containing data about the universe of the Night's Dawn trilogy. Hamilton re-set several earlier short stories set in the Confederation timeline, published as the collection A Second Chance at Eden (see "Short story collections" below), including the newly written title novella.

Commonwealth universe (2002–2016)

Misspent Youth

Misspent Youth (2002) is shorter than Hamilton's previous works, and again depicts a near-future version of Britain. This was his least well received book critically. Misspent Youth is placed in the same universe as the Commonwealth Saga, though it is not integral to the storyline of those novels. Much of the technology used in those novels (rejuvenation and low-cost/high-capacity memory storage) is established within this book.

Commonwealth Saga

 Pandora's Star (2004), 
 Judas Unchained (2005), 

The Commonwealth Saga is published in two halves, Pandora's Star and Judas Unchained. Set approximately 300 years later in the same universe as Misspent Youth, it explores the social effects of the almost complete elimination of the experience of death following widespread use of the rejuvenation technique described in Misspent Youth. In somewhat similar style to Night's Dawn, Hamilton also outlines, in detail, a universe with a small number of distinct alien species interacting essentially peacefully and who suddenly become faced with an increasingly ominous external threat. The saga focuses on wormhole technology and the first expansion in the space nearer to earth. Fifteen key new worlds are established.

Void Trilogy

 The Dreaming Void (2007), 
 The Temporal Void (2008), 
 The Evolutionary Void (2010), 

Set in the same universe as the Commonwealth Saga, the Void Trilogy is set 1200 years after the end of Judas Unchained. A time line that links the Commonwealth Saga with the Void Trilogy, filling in the 1200-year gap, has been written by Hamilton.

The Chronicle of the Fallers

 The Abyss Beyond Dreams (2014), 
 Night Without Stars (2016),  (UK),  (US)

Hamilton announced in 2011 that he is developing a new trilogy.  He later cut this down to two books titled The Chronicle of the Fallers. It is a return to his Commonwealth Universe, set in the same time-frame as the Void Trilogy, and tells the story of Nigel Sheldon and what happened when he broke into the Void.

The Queen of Dreams (2014–2017)
 The Secret Throne (2014), 
 The Hunting of the Princes (2016)
 A Voyage Through Air (10 August 2017)
A children's fantasy series also known as Book of the Realms. Taggie and Jemima are summer holidaying on their dad's farm. They know just what to expect—a tumbledown cottage, sunshine and strawberry-picking. But then Jemima sees a white squirrel wearing glasses… And things become even more extraordinary when their dad is captured and whisked away to a faerie world.

Salvation Sequence (2018–2020)
 Salvation (2018), 
 Salvation Lost (2019)
 The Saints of Salvation (2020)

Hamilton's Salvation sequence involves two concurrent story lines. One is set during the year 2204. In this period humanity has developed near-instantaneous space travel via a network of QSE (quantum-spatial entanglement) portals and are using them to begin spreading out into the galaxy. As a consequence of this technology, crewed spaceships are unnecessary. When an unknown vessel is found on a recently explored world, a team of specialists are sent out to investigate both the craft and the astonishing contents therein. The other story line is set much farther in the future. It follows a genetically engineered team of special forces designed to confront and destroy an enemy who are following their religious agenda of harvesting all sentient species in the galaxy.

Arkship Trilogy (2021–present)
 A Hole In the Sky (2021), 
 The Captain’s Daughter (2022), 
 Queens Of An Alien Sun (2022), 

Released as an audiobook exclusive, Arkship Trilogy is a departure from the typical widescreen space opera Hamilton is known for, instead focusing on a colony ship story from a first-person perspective. After that he is contracted to write a new two-book space opera series in a different universe.

Standalone novels
 Fallen Dragon (2001), 

His full-length novel Fallen Dragon is in many ways a condensation of the ideas and styles (and even characters) of the Night's Dawn trilogy, if rather darker in tone. The stand-alone book describes a bleak corporatocratic society dominated by five mega-corporations which wield almost unlimited power. It describes the troubled military campaign by one of these companies to "realise assets" from a minor colony, through the eyes of a veteran mercenary. One of the more interesting aspects of the book was its unconventional description of a spacefaring society which has  developed interstellar travel but only at vast expense, putting it out of the reach of many people and a one-way trip for most of the rest.

 Great North Road (2012), 

Set in Newcastle upon Tyne in 2143, the Great North Road is a futuristic murder-mystery.

 Light Chaser, with Gareth L. Powell (2021), ISBN 9781250769824

Short story collections
 A Second Chance at Eden (1998, collection of short stories set in the Confederation universe), 
Sonnie's Edge (originally published in New Moon, Issue 1, September 1991). Animated as a short in the adult cartoon series Love Death & Robots (Netflix streaming 2021)
A Second Chance at Eden
New Days Old Times
Candy Buds
Deathday
The Lives and Loves of Tiarella Rosa
Escape Route
 Manhattan In Reverse (2011)
Watching Trees Grow (2000, novella originally published as a limited signed edition by PS Publishing; later anthologised in Futures; then published in a mass market paperback edition), .)
Footvote (2005)
If at first ... (2011 short story broadcast on BBC Radio 4 Extra)
The Forever Kitten (2005)
Blessed by an Angel (2007)
The Demon Trap (2011)
Manhattan In Reverse (2011)

Other short fiction
 "De-De and the Beanstalk" (1992, published in New Moon, Issue 2, January 1992)
 "Falling Stones" (1992)
 "Spare Capacity" (1993)
 "Adam's Gene" (1993)
 "Starlight Dreamer" (1994)
 "Eat Re-ecebread" with Graham Joyce (1994, published in Interzone)
 "The White Stuff" with Graham Joyce (1997)
 "Lightstorm" (1998, Web 2027 # 5)
 "The Suspect Genome" (1993, novella featuring Mandel published in Interzone, republished as "Family Matters" in 2014)
 "Softlight Sins" (unknown)
 "Return of the Mutant Worms" (2011, published in Solaris Rising)
 A Window Into Time (2016)
 "Sonnie's Union" (2020, published in the collection "Made To Order" edited by Jonathan Strahan )

Notes

Bibliographies by writer
Bibliographies of English writers
Science fiction bibliographies